Ulvi Isgandarov (born on 24 October 1997) is an Azerbaijani professional footballer who plays as a striker for Gabala in the Azerbaijan Premier League.

Career

Club
On 10 February 2018, Isgandarov made his debut in the Azerbaijan Premier League for Sumgayit match against Zira.

Career statistics

Club

References

External links
 

1997 births
Living people
Association football forwards
Azerbaijani footballers
Azerbaijan under-21 international footballers
Azerbaijan youth international footballers
Azerbaijan Premier League players
Gabala FC players
Sumgayit FK players